Iain Andrew Stirling (born 27 January 1988) is a Scottish comedian, writer, television presenter, actor, narrator and Twitch streamer from Edinburgh, Scotland.

Stand-up career
Having started stand-up whilst in his final year of Law at the University of Edinburgh, a year which saw him make the final of both the Paramount Funniest Student and Chortle Student Comedian Of The Year competitions, Stirling is a regular on the UK comedy circuit. Having been dubbed one of Scotland's 'Hottest Newcomers' by The Scotsman after his performance in front of 750 people at the Glasgow Fruitmarket, he now gigs all over the UK including The Stand (Edinburgh and Glasgow), The Comedy Store (Manchester and London), Off The Kerb and various smaller clubs.

In August 2009, Stirling performed in the final of the Chortle Student Comedian Of The Year at the Edinburgh Fringe Festival, finishing runner-up to winner Joe Lycett.

TV and radio

CBBC
After being spotted at a gig, Stirling presented the CBBC Channel along with his canine sidekick Hacker T. Dog from the CBBC TV show Scoop, and other sidekicks including Dodge the Dog, 'The Toad of Wisdom', and 'Pig With 'Tasche'. He has also worked as a writer on a number of projects for the likes of CBBC and BBC Scotland. He also appeared in Scoop as the postboy in the first four episodes of the new series.

The Dog Ate My Homework
In early October 2013, Stirling began recording for a new series for CBBC, The Dog Ate My Homework, which was commissioned as the CBBC answer to Mock the Week. The show features two teams of comedians or celebrities and a child as team leader. Stirling hosts the show of 'off-the-wall questions, nonsensical studio games, and slapstick challenges'. He was nominated for a BAFTA in 2014 for best children's presenter for his hosting of the programme for two series.

Other
In 2012 Iain appeared on Russell Howard's Good News In June 2015, Stirling became the narrator of ITV2 reality series Love Island, In 2017, he began hosting the comedy game show CelebAbility. Stirling hosted Scotland's Big Night Out on 31 December 2017, as part of BBC Scotland's Hogmanay 2017. In February 2019, it was announced that Stirling would be a contestant on the eighth series of Taskmaster. He also was the host of the first programme on the BBC Scotland channel, A Night at the Theatre.

In April–May 2019, over six episodes, Stirling featured as one of the six comedians on the TV show Comedy Bus, in which each comedian took the others back to their home towns, Stirling took the group back to his native Edinburgh.

On 19 November 2020, Stirling featured as a panellist on the ITV Daytime show, Loose Women, and made history as being part of the show's first all male panel in the show's 21 year history.

Since June 2020, Stirling has appeared as a regular cast member on Celebrity Gogglebox, alongside his wife, Laura Whitmore.

In March 2021, Stirling announced he had created a new sitcom with Steve Bugeja.  Buffering began airing on ITV2 in summer 2021.

Internet
Stirling operates his own channel on the internet streaming service Twitch in which he interacts with viewers whilst playing video games such as FIFA. As of October 2021 his channel has grown to over 65,000 followers.

In June 2022, Stirling and his wife Laura Whitmore started a true crime podcast together called "Partners in Crime with Laura Whitmore and Iain Stirling".

In February 2023, Stirling appeared in a video by the Sidemen called “The Roast of the Sidemen 2”.

Personal life 
In 2020, Stirling married presenter, model and actress Laura Whitmore in a humanist ceremony at Dublin City Hall. Whitmore gave birth to the couple's daughter, Stevie Re, in late March 2021.

References

External links 
Iain Stirling Official website

1988 births
Living people
Alumni of the University of Edinburgh
People educated at Liberton High School
Entertainers from Edinburgh
Scottish stand-up comedians
Scottish television presenters
Twitch (service) streamers